Marc López and Rafael Nadal were the defending champions but Nadal decided not to participate. López played alongside Albert Ramos, but the pair was defeated in the second round by Dmitry Tursunov and Nenad Zimonjić.

Filip Polášek and Lukáš Rosol defeated Christopher Kas and Philipp Kohlschreiber in the final with a score of 6–3, 6–4 to win their first title in Doha.

Seeds

Draw

Draw

External links
 Main Draw

Doubles